Abdul Shakur Mohammed (born 27 August 2003) is a Ghanaian professional footballer who plays as a forward for Orlando City of Major League Soccer.

A Right to Dream Academy graduate, Mohammed played college soccer for two seasons at Duke University before being selected by Orlando City as the second-overall pick in the 2023 MLS SuperDraft.

Early life

Youth career
Born in Kumasi, Ghana, Mohammed graduated from the Right to Dream Academy before emigrating to the United States to complete his high school studies at Millbrook School in Stanford, New York. While at Millbrook he helped lead the school's soccer team to the Class C New England Preparatory School Athletic Council (NEPSAC) Championship in 2018. He also played club soccer at Black Rock FC. In July 2020, Mohammed verbally committed to Duke University and took summer classes to accelerate his high school graduation.

College career
Mohammed played two seasons of college soccer as a two-year starter for the Duke Blue Devils between 2021 and 2022. As a freshman he totaled three goals and seven assists in 18 appearances. Duke reached the 2021 ACC tournament final before losing 2–0 to Notre Dame Fighting Irish. Individually he was named ACC Freshman of the Year as well as All-ACC Second Team. TopDrawerSoccer.com named him to the Freshman Best XI.

In his second season, Mohammed started all 19 of Duke's games and led the team in scoring with 10 goals as well as registering two assists. He was named ACC Offensive Player of the Year, earned All-ACC First Team and All-American First Team honours, and was a Hermann Trophy semi-finalist.

While at college, Mohammed also played for Manhattan SC during the 2022 USL League Two season, making five appearances as the team topped the Metropolitan Division.

Professional career

Orlando City
In December 2022, Mohammed declared early for the 2023 MLS SuperDraft, signing a Generation Adidas contract with Major League Soccer to forgo the remainder of his college eligibility. He was drafted in the first round (2nd overall) by Orlando City after the club traded away Ruan to D.C. United earlier in the day to acquire the pick.

Career statistics

College

Club

Honours
Manhattan SC
USL League Two Metropolitan Division: 2022

Individual
ACC Freshman of the Year: 2021
ACC Offensive Player of the Year: 2022
NCAA First Team All-America: 2022

References

External links 
Shakur Mohammend at Duke Blue Devils

Living people
2003 births
Ghanaian footballers
Footballers from Kumasi
Association football forwards
Association football midfielders
Duke Blue Devils men's soccer players
All-American men's college soccer players
Orlando City SC draft picks
Right to Dream Academy players
Orlando City SC players
USL League Two players
Ghanaian expatriate footballers
Expatriate soccer players in the United States
Ghanaian expatriate sportspeople in the United States